Basil John Kenyon  (19 May 1918 – 9 May 1996) was a South African rugby union player.

Biography
Kenyon was born in Umtata, and grew up in the Transkei. He joined the SA forces during the World War II in North Africa and Italy. On return to South Africa he moved to East London to join .

In 1949, Kenyon was selected to make his debut for the Springboks in the fourth and final test match against the All Blacks and was also named captain. He was the appointed captain of the Springbok team to tour Britain, Ireland and France in 1951. Kenyon played in five tour matches and in the match against Pontypool, he injured his eye so severely that it ended his tour and he never played rugby again. In his 5 tour matches he scored 13 points, which included 2 tries, 2 conversions and a penalty goal.

After his playing days, Kenyon started coaching and in 1958 he was the Springboks' coach in the Test series against France.

Test history

See also
List of South Africa national rugby union players – Springbok no. 286

References

1918 births
1996 deaths
South African rugby union players
South Africa international rugby union players
South African rugby union coaches
Border Bulldogs players
South Africa national rugby union team captains
South African military personnel of World War II
Rugby union players from the Eastern Cape
Rugby union flankers